The Niandan river is a tributary of the Niger river.

References 

Rivers of Guinea
Tributaries of the Niger River